Xanthoparmelia lobuliferella is a species of saxicolous (rock-dwelling), foliose lichen in the family Parmeliaceae. Found in South Africa, it was formally described as a new species in 2002 by Australian lichenologist John Elix. It contains several lichen products: major amounts of usnic acid and stictic acid, and minor amounts of constictic acid, norstictic acid, cryptostictic acid, lobaric acid, stenosporonic acid, lichesterinic acid, and protolichesterinic acid. The species epithet refers to its resemblance to Xanthoparmelia lobulifera.

See also
List of Xanthoparmelia species

References

lobuliferella
Lichen species
Lichens described in 2002
Lichens of South Africa
Taxa named by John Alan Elix